Henry A. Barnhart (September 11, 1858 – March 26, 1934) was an American businessman and politician who served as a U.S. representative from Indiana from 1908 to 1919.

Biography
Born near Twelve Mile, Indiana, Barnhart attended the common schools, Amboy Academy, and Wabash Normal Training School.
He was a teacher, farmer, surveyor of Fulton County, Indiana from 1885 to 1887, newspaper publisher, and businessman.
He served as director of the United States Bank Trust Co..
He served as director, Indiana State Prison, 1893. He was also a hospital executive.

Congress 
Barnhart was elected as a Democrat to the Sixtieth Congress to fill the vacancy caused by the death of United States Representative Abraham L. Brick.
He was reelected to the Sixty-first and to the four succeeding Congresses (November 3, 1908 – March 3, 1919).
He was an unsuccessful candidate for reelection to the Sixty-sixth Congress in 1918.
He later worked as a lecturer.

Death 
He died on March 26, 1934, in Rochester, Indiana.
He was interred in the Mausoleum in Rochester.

References

1858 births
1934 deaths
Democratic Party members of the United States House of Representatives from Indiana
People from Cass County, Indiana
19th-century American businesspeople
20th-century American businesspeople
20th-century American politicians
Educators from Indiana
American surveyors
Farmers from Indiana
American newspaper publishers (people)
People from Rochester, Indiana